Boeing Defense, Space & Security (BDS) is a division (business unit) of The Boeing Company based in Arlington, Virginia. It is responsible for defense and aerospace products and services. It was formerly known as Boeing Integrated Defense Systems (IDS).

Boeing Integrated Defense Systems was formed in 2002 by combining the former "Military Aircraft and Missile Systems" and "Space and Communications" divisions. Boeing Defense, Space & Security made Boeing the third-largest defense contractor in the world in 2021.

Boeing Defense, Space & Security is a consolidated group that brought together major names in aerospace; Boeing Military Airplane Company; Hughes Satellite Systems; Hughes Helicopters minus the civilian helicopter line (which was divested as MD Helicopters); Piasecki Helicopter, subsequently known as Boeing Vertol and then Boeing Helicopters; the St. Louis-based McDonnell division of the former McDonnell Douglas Company; and the former North American Aviation division of Rockwell International.

History 
Boeing Defense, Space & Security was headquartered in Greater St. Louis north of St. Louis Lambert International Airport in the northern St. Louis suburb of Berkeley, Missouri until January 2017, when top executives and support staff were relocated to Arlington, Virginia. There are also significant operations in nearby Missouri communities, such as Hazelwood and St. Charles. It remains one of the largest employers in Greater St. Louis with 13,707 local employees as of 2018.

Other major locations of BDS are in California and Washington state. Boeing chose to locate the defense systems offices in the St. Louis area because of the role of the space and aircraft programs of the former McDonnell Douglas location, and bipartisan support from area politicians.

Organization 
Boeing BDS was reorganized in June 2018:

In November 2022, Boeing consolidated its defense, space and security business from eight divisions into four, according to a company statement. Those reorganized divisions now focus on vertical lift; mobility, surveillance and bombers; air dominance; and space, intelligence and weapons systems, led by Ted Colbert, president and chief executive officer of BDS. This followed the third quarter of 2022 when Boeing's defense business reported losses of US$2.8 billion (KC-46A Pegasus program was around $1.2 billion charge; VC-25B Air Force One was $766 million),

 Vertical Lift, led by Vice President and General Manager Mark Cherry – The world's largest provider of military rotorcraft with a diverse portfolio of cargo, tiltrotor, and attack platforms.
 Mobility, Surveillance & Bombers, led by Vice President and General Manager Dan Gillian, which includes KC-46, SAOC, E-7, VC-25B, P-8, Bombers, AWACS/AEW&C, 777X components and all executive transport programs.
 Air Dominance, led by Vice President and General Manager Steve Nordlund, which includes classified programs; the F/A-18, F-15, T-7, MQ-25 and MQ-28 programs; and the non-space Phantom Works portfolio, including the Virtual Warfare Centers. Nordlund is the senior site executive for the St. Louis region.
 Space, Intelligence & Weapon Systems, led by Vice President and General Manager Kay Sears, which includes space exploration and launch programs, satellites, munitions, missiles, weapon system deterrents, maritime undersea, Phantom Works Space and subsidiaries (BI&A, Millennium, Insitu, Liquid Robotics, Spectrolab, Argon and DRT). This includes space exploration and launch programs, satellites and Phantom Works Space.

Management 
In 2022, Ted Colbert was president and chief executive officer of BDS. of Defense, Space & Security (BDS), a division of The Boeing Company.

 President & CEO: Ted Colbert
 President of N&SS: Jim H. Chilton 
 President of Phantom Works: Darryl W. Davis

Products

Bomber aircraft 
 Boeing YB-9
 Boeing XB-15 (1 prototype)
 Boeing B-17 Flying Fortress
 Boeing XB-38 Flying Fortress
 Boeing YB-40 Flying Fortress
 Boeing C-108 Flying Fortress
 List of Boeing B-17 Flying Fortress variants
 Boeing Y1B-20
 Boeing B-29 Superfortress
 Boeing KB-29 Superfortress
 Boeing XB-39 Superfortress
 B-29 Superfortress variants
 Boeing B-47 Stratojet
 Boeing B-50 Superfortress
 Boeing B-52 Stratofortress
 Boeing B-54
 Boeing XB-55
 Boeing XB-56
 Boeing XB-59
 Boeing TB – torpedo bomber

Rotorcraft 
 Boeing AH-6
 Boeing AH-64 Apache
 Boeing Vertol CH-46 Sea Knight (Vertol Aircraft Corp.)
 Boeing Vertol CH-47 Chinook (Vertol Aircraft Corp.)
 Boeing Chinook (UK variants)
 Boeing Vertol YUH-61
 Boeing Vertol XCH-62
 MH-139 Grey Wolf (with Leonardo S.p.A.)
 V-22 Osprey (with Bell Helicopter)
 Quad TiltRotor (with Bell Helicopter)
 RAH-66 Comanche (with Sikorsky), reconnaissance and light attack helicopter, canceled
 SkyHook JHL-40

Fighter and attack aircraft 

 Boeing Model 15
 Boeing F2B
 Boeing F3B
 Boeing XF6B
 Boeing XF8B
 Boeing F-15E Strike Eagle
 Boeing F-15SE Silent Eagle
 Boeing F/A-18E/F Super Hornet
 Boeing EA-18G Growler
 Lockheed Martin F-22 Raptor (partner with prime contractor Lockheed Martin)
 Boeing GA-1
 Boeing XP-4
 Boeing XP-7
 Boeing XP-8
 Boeing XP-9
 Boeing P-12
 Boeing XP-15
 Boeing P-26 Peashooter
 Boeing P-29
 Boeing X-32, Boeing's entry for the Joint Strike Fighter program

Experimental aircraft 
 Boeing Bird of Prey
 Boeing X-40
 Boeing X-53 Active Aeroelastic Wing

Tankers and transport aircraft 

 Boeing YC-14
 Boeing C-17 Globemaster III
 Boeing C-22
 Boeing VC-25
 Boeing C-32
 Boeing C-40 Clipper
 Boeing KC-46 Pegasus
 Boeing C-97 Stratofreighter
 Boeing KC-97 Stratofreighter
 Boeing C-127
 Boeing C-135 Stratolifter
 Boeing EC-135
 Boeing KC-135 Stratotanker
 Boeing NC-135
 Boeing OC-135B Open Skies – (3 Treaty on Open Skies observation aircraft)
 Boeing RC-135
 Boeing WC-135 Constant Phoenix
 Boeing C-137 Stratoliner
 Boeing CC-137
 Boeing KC-767
 Boeing Pelican

Trainer aircraft 
 Boeing Model 2
 Boeing XAT-15
 Boeing NB
 Boeing T-43 navigator trainer
 Boeing Skyfox
 Boeing T-7 Red Hawk

Electronic warfare, surveillance and other military variants 

 Boeing 737 AEW&C (E-7 Wedgetail)
 Boeing Model 42
 Boeing YAL-1 Airborne Laser
 Boeing E-3 Sentry (an AWACS surveillance aircraft)
 Boeing E-4 (Advanced Airborne Command Post)
 Boeing E-6 Mercury
 Boeing E-767 (AWACS)
 Boeing P-8 Poseidon (Anti-submarine warfare)
 Boeing XPB
 Boeing XP3B
 Boeing XPBB Sea Ranger

Utility aircraft 
 Boeing Model 1
 Boeing L-15 Scout

Unmanned aerial vehicles 

 Boeing Insitu RQ-21 Blackjack
 Boeing YQM-94
 Boeing CQM-121 Pave Tiger – anti-radar drone
 Boeing X-45//Phantom Ray – technology demonstrators
 Boeing X-46
 Boeing X-48
 Boeing X-50 Dragonfly – experimental Gyrodyne UAV
 Boeing X-51
 Boeing A160 Hummingbird – development UAV helicopter
 Boeing Condor
 Boeing DARPA Vulture
 Boeing HALE
 Boeing Insitu ScanEagle
 Boeing MQ-25 Stingray
 Boeing Phantom Eye – a high altitude, long range UAV
 Boeing Persistent Munition Technology Demonstrator
 Boeing SolarEagle
 GQM-163 Coyote
 MA-31
Boeing MQ-28 Ghost Bat - previously known as Airpower Teaming System

Missiles 
 CIM-10 Bomarc
 LGM-30 Minuteman
 AGM-69 SRAM
 AGM-86 ALCM Cruise Missile
 MGM-118 Peacekeeper
 UUM-125 Sea Lance
 AGM-131 SRAM II
 Boeing Ground-to-Air Pilotless Aircraft
 Harpoon (missile)
 Standoff Land Attack Missile
 AGM-84H/K SLAM-ER

Space launch and spacecraft 

Boeing Launch Services Inc. (BLS) is Boeing's commercial launch service provider. On behalf of its commercial customers, BLS administers launch service contracts for Delta II and Delta IV launches conducted by United Launch Alliance.  In November 2010, Boeing Defense, Space & Security was selected by NASA for consideration for potential contract awards for heavy lift launch vehicle system concepts, and propulsion technologies.
 S-IC first stage
 Lunar Roving Vehicle
 X-38 Crew Return Vehicle
 Inertial Upper Stage (Titan IV and Space Shuttle)
 International Space Station
 Space Shuttle orbiter (Rockwell)
 Delta (rocket family) (aka Thor-Delta)
 Delta II rocket
 Delta III rocket
 Delta IV rocket
 Sea Launch (with Energia, Aker Kværner, and Yuzhnoe)
 Starliner manned space capsule
 Space Launch System core stage
Human Landing System

Spaceplanes 
 Boeing X-20 Dyna-Soar (canceled)
 Boeing X-37
 Boeing X-40

Satellites 
 ARGOS (satellite)
 Autonomous Space Transport Robotic Operations (ASTRO)
 GPS Satellites (Rockwell)
 Integrated Solar Upper Stage
 Kinetic Energy Anti-Satellite Weapon System
 XSS Micro-satellite
 376 (formerly Hughes Satellite Systems – HSS)
 601 (formerly HSS)
 702 (formerly HSS)

Space probes 
 Lunar Orbiter program
 Surveyor program
 Mariner 10
 Mars Science Laboratory

Other 

 AN/TWQ-1 Avenger – lightweight air defense vehicle
 Pegasus-class hydrofoil – patrol craft (6 built by Boeing Marine)
 GBU-39 Small Diameter Bomb – 250 lb glide bomb

Facilities 
On July 21, 2006, Boeing announced that it would be consolidating its Southern California locations. The Boeing facility in Anaheim will be moving to Huntington Beach, California.
 Huntsville, Alabama (Spacelab, International Space Station, Delta, Ground-based Midcourse Defense)
 Mesa, Arizona (AH-64, AH-6i)
 Anaheim, California
 El Segundo, California (satellite complex: 601, 702)
 Long Beach, California (C-17 until 2015)
 Palmdale, California (Space Shuttle)
 Pleasanton, California
 Seal Beach, California Saturn V rocket and Apollo Capsule  (original contractor North American later Rockwell International)
 Huntington Beach, California (Saturn V, X-51A, Apollo, Skylab, Space Shuttle, Delta, and ISS)
 Kennedy Space Center, Florida (as part of United Space Alliance and United Launch Alliance)
 Macon, Georgia (C-17, a-10, ch-47) Closing down December 2016
 New Orleans, Louisiana (S-IC stage – Boeing was the prime contractor where the Michoud Assembly Facility was used for the final assembly)
 St. Louis, Missouri (F-15, F/A-18)
 St. Charles, Missouri (weapons)
 Tulsa, Oklahoma (F-15/F-15E)
 Philadelphia, Pennsylvania (H-47, V-22) H-46 production ended.
 El Paso, Texas (B-1B, PAC-3, power and electronics components for ISS, F-22, and F-15, assembly and test for Minuteman III missile guidance system)
 Houston, Texas
 San Antonio, Texas (military aircraft maintenance)
 Puget Sound region, Washington
 Washington, D.C. area

See also

 Boeing Rotorcraft Systems
 Airbus Defence and Space
 Lockheed Martin Space Systems
 NewSpace
 Northrop Grumman

References

External links 

 Boeing Defense, Space & Security official site
 Boeing Defense, Space & Security - About BDS

Boeing
Defense companies of the United States
Aircraft manufacturers of the United States
Companies based in St. Louis County, Missouri
Berkeley, Missouri
Companies based in Arlington County, Virginia
Military vehicle manufacturers